Hafiz Abdul Kareem (born 1 January 1960) is a Pakistani politician who served as Minister for Communications, in Abbasi cabinet from August 2017 to May 2018. He has been a member of the Senate of Pakistan since March 2018. Previously he had been a Member of the National Assembly of Pakistan from June 2013 to 2018.

Early life and education
He was born on 1 January 1960.

He has completed matriculation level education.

Political career

He ran for the seat of the National Assembly of Pakistan as a candidate of Pakistan Muslim League (N) (PML-N) from Constituency NA-172 (Dera Ghazi Khan-II) in 2008 Pakistani general election, but was unsuccessful. He received 41,894 votes and lost the seat to Farooq Leghari.

He ran for the seat of the National Assembly  as a candidate of PML-N from Constituency NA-172 (Dera Ghazi Khan-II) in by-election held in March 2011, but was unsuccessful. He received 41,894 votes and lost the seat to Awais Leghari.

He was elected to the National Assembly  as a candidate of PML-N from Constituency NA-172 (Dera Ghazi Khan-II) in 2013 Pakistani general election. He received 49,230 votes and defeated Jamal Leghari.

Following the election of Shahid Khaqan Abbasi  as Prime Minister  of Pakistan  in August 2017, he was inducted into the federal cabinet of Abbasi and was appointed as federal minister for Communication for the first time.

He was nominated by PML-N as its candidate in 2018 Pakistani Senate election. However the Election Commission of Pakistan declared all PML-N candidates for the Senate election as independent after a ruling of the Supreme Court of Pakistan.

He was elected to the Senate of Pakistan as an independent candidate on a technocrat seat from Punjab in Senate election. He was backed in the election by PML-N and joined the treasury benches, led by PML-N after getting elected. He took oath as Senator on 12 March 2018. On 12 March 2018, he ceased to hold the office of Federal Minister for Communication due to resignation from the National Assembly. On 15 March 2018, he was re-inducted into the federal cabinet of Prime Minister Shahid Khaqan Abbasi and was re-appointed as Federal Minister for Communications. Upon the dissolution of the National Assembly on the expiration of its term on 31 May 2018, Kareem ceased to hold the office as Federal Minister for Communications.

References

Living people
Pakistan Muslim League (N) politicians
Punjabi people
1960 births
Pakistani MNAs 2013–2018
Communications Ministers of Pakistan